In geometry, a Euclidean plane isometry is an isometry of the Euclidean plane, or more informally, a way of transforming the plane that preserves geometrical properties such as length. There are four types: translations, rotations, reflections, and glide reflections (see below under ).

The set of Euclidean plane isometries forms a group under composition: the Euclidean group in two dimensions.  It is generated by reflections in lines, and every element of the Euclidean group is the composite of at most three distinct reflections.

Informal discussion

Informally, a Euclidean plane isometry is any way of transforming the plane without "deforming" it. For example, suppose that the Euclidean plane is represented by a sheet of transparent plastic sitting on a desk. Examples of isometries include:
 Shifting the sheet one inch to the right.
 Rotating the sheet by ten degrees around some marked point (which remains motionless).
 Turning the sheet over to look at it from behind. Notice that if a picture is drawn on one side of the sheet, then after turning the sheet over, we see the mirror image of the picture.

These are examples of translations, rotations, and reflections respectively. There is one further type of isometry, called a glide reflection (see below under classification of Euclidean plane isometries).

However, folding, cutting, or melting the sheet are not considered isometries. Neither are less drastic alterations like bending, stretching, or twisting.

Formal definition

An isometry of the Euclidean plane is a distance-preserving transformation of the plane. That is, it is a map

such that for any points p and q in the plane,

where d(p, q) is the usual Euclidean distance between p and q.

Classification 

It can be shown that there are four types of Euclidean plane isometries. (Note: the notations for the types of isometries listed below are not completely standardised.)

Reflections
 
Reflections, or mirror isometries, denoted by Fc,v, where c is a point in the plane and v is a unit vector in  R2. (F is for "flip".) have the effect of reflecting the point p in the line L that is perpendicular to v and that passes through c. The line L is called the reflection axis or the associated mirror. To find a formula for Fc,v, we first use the dot product to find the component t of p − c in the v direction,

and then we obtain the reflection of p by subtraction,

The combination of rotations about the origin and reflections about a line through the origin is obtained with all orthogonal matrices (i.e. with determinant 1 and −1) forming orthogonal group O(2). In the case of a determinant of −1 we have:

which is a reflection in the x-axis followed by a rotation by an angle θ, or equivalently, a reflection in a line making an angle of θ/2 with the x-axis. Reflection in a parallel line corresponds to adding a vector perpendicular to it.

Translations
 
Translations, denoted by Tv, where v is a vector in R2 have the effect of shifting the plane in the direction of v. That is, for any point p in the plane,

or in terms of (x, y) coordinates,

A translation can be seen as a composite of two parallel reflections.

Rotations
 
Rotations, denoted by Rc,θ, where c is a point in the plane (the centre of rotation), and θ is the angle of rotation. In terms of coordinates, rotations are most easily expressed by breaking them up into two operations. First, a rotation around the origin is given by

These matrices are the orthogonal matrices (i.e. each is a square matrix G whose transpose is its inverse, i.e. ), with determinant 1 (the other possibility for orthogonal matrices is −1, which gives a mirror image, see below). They form the special orthogonal group SO(2).

A rotation around c can be accomplished by first translating c to the origin, then performing the rotation around the origin, and finally translating the origin back to c. That is,

or in other words,

Alternatively, a rotation around the origin is performed, followed by a translation:

A rotation can be seen as a composite of two non-parallel reflections.

Rigid transformations

The set of translations and rotations together form the rigid motions or rigid displacements. This set forms a group under composition, the group of rigid motions, a subgroup of the full group of Euclidean isometries.

Glide reflections
 
Glide reflections, denoted by Gc,v,w, where c is a point in the plane, v is a unit vector in R2, and w is non-null a vector perpendicular to v are a combination of a reflection in the line described by c and v, followed by a translation along w. That is,

or in other words,

(It is also true that

that is, we obtain the same result if we do the translation and the reflection in the opposite order.)

Alternatively we multiply by an orthogonal matrix with determinant −1 (corresponding to a reflection in a line through the origin), followed by a translation. This is a glide reflection, except in the special case that the translation is perpendicular to the line of reflection, in which case the combination is itself just a reflection in a parallel line.

The identity isometry, defined by I(p) = p for all points p is a special case of a translation, and also a special case of a rotation. It is the only isometry which belongs to more than one of the types described above.

In all cases we multiply the position vector by an orthogonal matrix and add a vector; if the determinant is 1 we have a rotation, a translation, or the identity, and if it is −1 we have a glide reflection or a reflection.

A "random" isometry, like taking a sheet of paper from a table and randomly laying it back, "almost surely" is a rotation or a glide reflection (they have three degrees of freedom). This applies regardless of the details of the probability distribution, as long as θ and the direction of the added vector are independent and uniformly distributed and the length of the added vector has a continuous distribution. A pure translation and a pure reflection are special cases with only two degrees of freedom, while the identity is even more special, with no degrees of freedom.

Isometries as reflection group

Reflections, or mirror isometries, can be combined to produce any isometry. Thus isometries are an example of a reflection group.

Mirror combinations 

In the Euclidean plane, we have the following possibilities.

 [d  ] Identity
Two reflections in the same mirror restore each point to its original position. All points are left fixed. Any pair of identical mirrors has the same effect.
 [db] Reflection
As Alice found through the looking-glass, a single mirror causes left and right hands to switch. (In formal terms, topological orientation is reversed.) Points on the mirror are left fixed. Each mirror has a unique effect.
 [dp] Rotation
Two distinct intersecting mirrors have a single point in common, which remains fixed. All other points rotate around it by twice the angle between the mirrors. Any two mirrors with the same fixed point and same angle give the same rotation, so long as they are used in the correct order.
 [dd] Translation
Two distinct mirrors that do not intersect must be parallel. Every point moves the same amount, twice the distance between the mirrors, and in the same direction. No points are left fixed. Any two mirrors with the same parallel direction and the same distance apart give the same translation, so long as they are used in the correct order.
 [dq] Glide reflection
Three mirrors. If they are all parallel, the effect is the same as a single mirror (slide a pair to cancel the third). Otherwise we can find an equivalent arrangement where two are parallel and the third is perpendicular to them. The effect is a reflection combined with a translation parallel to the mirror. No points are left fixed.

Three mirrors suffice 

Adding more mirrors does not add more possibilities (in the plane), because they can always be rearranged to cause cancellation.

Recognition 

We can recognize which of these isometries we have according to whether it preserves hands or swaps them, and whether it has at least one fixed point or not, as shown in the following table (omitting the identity).

Group structure 

Isometries requiring an odd number of mirrors — reflection and glide reflection — always reverse left and right. The even isometries — identity, rotation, and translation — never do; they correspond to rigid motions, and form a normal subgroup of the full Euclidean group of isometries. Neither the full group nor the even subgroup are abelian; for example, reversing the order of composition of two parallel mirrors reverses the direction of the translation they produce.

Since the even subgroup is normal, it is the kernel of a homomorphism to a quotient group, where the quotient is isomorphic to a group consisting of a reflection and the identity. However the full group is not a direct product, but only a semidirect product, of the even subgroup and the quotient group.

Composition 

Composition of isometries mixes kinds in assorted ways. We can think of the identity as either two mirrors or none; either way, it has no effect in composition. And two reflections give either a translation or a rotation, or the identity (which is both, in a trivial way). Reflection composed with either of these could cancel down to a single reflection; otherwise it gives the only available three-mirror isometry, a glide reflection. A pair of translations always reduces to a single translation; so the challenging cases involve rotations. We know a rotation composed with either a rotation or a translation must produce an even isometry. Composition with translation produces another rotation (by the same amount, with shifted fixed point), but composition with rotation can yield either translation or rotation. It is often said that composition of two rotations produces a rotation, and Euler proved a theorem to that effect in 3D; however, this is only true for rotations sharing a fixed point.

Translation, rotation, and orthogonal subgroups 

We thus have two new kinds of isometry subgroups: all translations, and rotations sharing a fixed point. Both are subgroups of the even subgroup, within which translations are normal. Because translations are a normal subgroup, we can factor them out leaving the subgroup of isometries with a fixed point, the orthogonal group.

Nested group construction 

The subgroup structure suggests another way to compose an arbitrary isometry:
 Pick a fixed point, and a mirror through it.
 If the isometry is odd, use the mirror; otherwise do not.
 If necessary, rotate around the fixed point.
 If necessary, translate.

This works because translations are a normal subgroup of the full group of isometries, with quotient the orthogonal group; and rotations about a fixed point are a normal subgroup of the orthogonal group, with quotient a single reflection.

Discrete subgroups 

The subgroups discussed so far are not only infinite, they are also continuous (Lie groups). Any subgroup containing at least one non-zero translation must be infinite, but subgroups of the orthogonal group can be finite. For example, the symmetries of a regular pentagon consist of rotations by integer multiples of 72° (360° / 5), along with reflections in the five mirrors which perpendicularly bisect the edges. This is a group, D5, with 10 elements. It has a subgroup, C5, of half the size, omitting the reflections. These two groups are members of two families, Dn and Cn, for any n > 1. Together, these families constitute the rosette groups.

Translations do not fold back on themselves, but we can take integer multiples of any finite translation, or sums of multiples of two such independent translations, as a subgroup. These generate the lattice of a periodic tiling of the plane.

We can also combine these two kinds of discrete groups — the discrete rotations and reflections around a fixed point and the discrete translations — to generate the frieze groups and wallpaper groups. Curiously, only a few of the fixed-point groups are found to be compatible with discrete translations. In fact, lattice compatibility imposes such a severe restriction that, up to isomorphism, we have only 7 distinct frieze groups and 17 distinct wallpaper groups. For example, the pentagon symmetries, D5, are incompatible with a discrete lattice of translations. (Each higher dimension also has only a finite number of such crystallographic groups, but the number grows rapidly; for example, 3D has 230 groups and 4D has 4783.)

Isometries in the complex plane
In terms of complex numbers, the isometries of the plane are either of the form

or of the form

It is then easy to see that g is either the identity or the conjugation, and the statement being proved follows from this and from the fact that .

This is obviously related to the previous classification of plane isometries, since:
 functions of the type  are translations;
 functions of the type  are rotations (when |ω| = 1);
 the conjugation is a reflection.

Note that a rotation about complex point p is obtained by complex arithmetic with

where the last expression shows the mapping equivalent to rotation at 0 and a translation.
Therefore, given direct isometry  one can solve  to obtain  as the center for an equivalent rotation, provided that , that is, provided the direct isometry is not a pure translation. As stated by Cederberg, "A direct isometry is either a rotation or a translation."

See also
 Beckman–Quarles theorem, a characterization of isometries as the transformations that preserve unit distances
 Congruence (geometry)
 Coordinate rotations and reflections
 Hjelmslev's theorem, the statement that the midpoints of corresponding pairs of points in an isometry of lines are collinear

References

External links
 Plane Isometries

Crystallography
Euclidean plane geometry
Euclidean symmetries
Group theory
Articles containing proofs